Megachile monstrifica is a species of bee in the family Megachilidae. It was described by Morawitz in 1878.

References

Monstrifica
Insects described in 1878